Postmans Ridge is a rural locality in the Lockyer Valley Region, Queensland, Australia.

History 
The locality was officially named and bounded on 18 February 2000.

Geography
Rocky Creek forms part of the south-western boundary before flowing through from west to east.

Road infrastructure
The Warrego Highway runs through from south-east to north-west, and the Toowoomba Connection Road runs from south-east to south-west.

References

Lockyer Valley Region
Localities in Queensland